Edward John Brayshaw (18 October 1933 – 28 December 1990) was an Australian actor who worked in Australia and England.

Australian career
He was a Melbourne-based actor in the 1950s and 1960s and often appeared on television and stage. He left Australia for England in May 1963.

British career
His television roles include the part of Rochefort in the 1966 serial The Three Musketeers and 1967's The Further Adventures of the Musketeers. He is perhaps most recognised for playing Harold Meaker in the children's series Rentaghost, throughout its eight-year run on BBC1.

He often appeared in TV adventure series, taking roles in several ITC series including The Saint, The Baron (in two episodes but in different roles), The Champions and Return of the Saint, often in villainous roles. In The Champions, for example, he played a mob boss. He appeared twice in Doctor Who: first as Léon Colbert in 1964's The Reign of Terror, and second as the War Chief, one of the main villains in the 1969 serial The War Games. He appeared in the 1969 Avengers episode "Homicide and Old Lace", which had been re-edited from an unfinished story entitled "The Great Great Britain Crime". Later roles included The Bill and Bergerac.

Brayshaw also appeared in various television commercials, including a 1980s advert for the Nationwide Building Society.

Brayshaw died of throat cancer in 1990.

Select Credits

Television
Sound of Thunder (1957)
Gaslight (1958)
Killer in Close-Up (1958) - "The Rattenbury Case"
The Soldier's Tale (1958)
One Morning Near Troodos (1959)
Till Death Do Us Part (1959)
Treason (1959)
Heart Attack (1960)
Dark Under the Sun (1960)
Who Killed Kovali? (1960)
Mine Own Executioner (1960)
Burst of Summer (1961)
The Ides of March (1961)
Two-Headed Eagle (1960)
The Lady from the Sea (1961)
Murder in the Cathedral (1962)
Shadow of the Vine (1962)
The Music Upstairs (1962)
The Pearl Fishers (1963)
The Chinese Wall (1963)

Theatre
One Bright Day (1957)
Nude with Violin (1958)
King Lear (1959)
Pirates at the Barn (1960)
Traveller without Luggage (1960)
Private Lives (1960)
The Caretaker (1961)
The Naked Island (1962)
Shipwreck (1962)
Saint Joan (1962)
The Tenth Man (1962)
Write Me a Murder (1962)

References

External links

1933 births
1990 deaths
British male television actors
20th-century British male actors
Deaths from throat cancer